Leighton Lucas (5 January 1903 – 1 November 1982) was an English composer and conductor. Born into a musical family (his father, Clarence Lucas, was also a noted composer and his mother Clara Asher-Lucas a concert pianist), he began his career as a dancer for Sergei Diaghilev's Ballets Russes (1918–21). He became a ballet conductor at 19, and in 1941 became musical director of the Ballet Guild, a wartime company for which he formed first a quintet, later an orchestra. He also worked as an arranger for Jack Hylton's orchestra between c.1926 and 1930.

Lucas was a self-taught composer of religious works and film music He is particularly noted for his film compositions, including the scores for Target for Tonight (1941), Alfred Hitchcock's Stage Fright (1950), Ice-Cold in Alex (1958) and the incidental music for The Dam Busters (based on the title march by Eric Coates).

His first major composition to receive recognition was the Partita for piano and chamber orchestra, broadcast in 1934 with the composer conducting the London Symphony Orchestra and his mother Clara Asher-Lucas as the solo pianist. Benjamin Britten described it as "very interesting – especially the quite lovely Sarabande." Lucas's Sinfonia Brevis (1936?) for horn and 11 instruments may be one of the earliest British scores to incorporate Balinese gamelan effects. It was also heard by Britten, who went on to use such effects in his music from Paul Bunyan.

Ballet de la Reine (1949, revised 1957) is a six movement suite taken from the sketches of an unperformed ballet, Pavan for Mary, which was originally intended for the Edinburgh Ballet Club. The music looks back to Elizabethan music forms (similarly to Peter Warlock's Capriol Suite) while also retaining a French flavour (because Mary, Queen of Scots spent her childhood in France).

Selected compositions

Orchestral
1934 – Partita (1934) for piano and chamber orchestra
1936? – Sinfonia Brevis for horn and 11 instruments
1945 – We of the West Riding 
1939 – Sonatina concertante for saxophone and orchestra
1940 – Suite française
1941 – March-Prelude (from Target for Tonight)
1942 – A Litany for orchestra
1947 –   Introductory Theme for Just William radio series
1949 – Ballet de la Reine for strings (revised 1957) 
1950 – Dedication (from Portrait of Clare (film)|Portrait of Clare)
1950 – Eve's Rhapsody (from Stage Fright)
1953 – This Is York (music from the documentary film)
1954 – Prelude and Dam Blast (from The Dam Busters)
1956 – Cello Concertino for cello and orchestra
1956 – Concert Champetre for violin and orchestra
1956 – Prelude, Aria and Finale for viola d'amore and orchestra
1957 – Clarinet Concerto
1957 – Portrait of the Amethyst (from Yangtse Incident)
1958 – Suite from Ice Cold in Alex
1970 – Birthday Variations

Ballet
1935 – The Wolf’s Ride
1936 – Death in Adagio (after Domenico Scarlatti)
1945-6 – The Horses
1972-3 – Tam O’Shanter

Brass Band
 1960 – Symphonic Suite
 1962 – Spring Song
 1968 – Chorale and Variations
 1973 – A Waltz Overture

Choral
1928 – Masque of the Sea for chorus and orchestra. Dedicated "To Mrs. Ernest Toye with All Affection"
1934 – Massa pro defunctis 
1953 – My True Love hath my Heart, madrigal for women's voices
1953 – Sleep and Death, partsong SATB
1967 – Mass in G minor
1969 – Parish Mass

Chamber
1956 – Meditation for cello and piano
1959 – Aubade for horn, bassoon and piano 
1960 – Soliloquy for viola and piano
1961 – Tristesse for viola and piano
1966 – Disquisition for two cellos and piano duet

Selected filmography
 Princess Charming (1934)
 The Cardinal (1936)
 Head over Heels (1937)
 Target for Tonight (1941)
 Now Barabbas (1949)
 Portrait of Clare (1950)
 Stage Fright (1950)
 The Weak and the Wicked (1954)
 The Dam Busters (1955)
 Yangtse Incident: The Story of H.M.S. Amethyst (1957)
 Ice Cold in Alex (1958)
 The Son of Robin Hood (1958)
 Serious Charge (1959)

References

External links
 
 Lucas, Tom (2011). The Lucas Family
 MusicWeb International (2012). The Film music of Arthur Banjamin and Leighton Lucas

1903 births
1982 deaths
20th-century classical musicians
20th-century English composers
20th-century British male musicians
Brass band composers
English film score composers
English male film score composers
Light music composers